Yan Bueno Couto (born 3 June 2002) is a Brazilian footballer who plays as a right back for Spanish club Girona FC, on loan from English club Manchester City.

Club career

Coritiba
Born in Curitiba, Paraná, Couto joined Coritiba's youth setup in 2012, aged ten. In 2019, while still in the youth categories, he was included in The Guardian's "Next Generation 2019" as one of the 60 best young talents of the world.

Promoted to the main squad for the 2020 season, Couto made his senior debut on 21 February, coming on as a first-half substitute for injured Patrick Vieira in a 2–0 Campeonato Paranaense home win against Cianorte.

Manchester City
On 1 March 2020, after being heavily linked to FC Barcelona, Couto agreed to a five-year contract with Premier League side Manchester City, effective as of 1 July. On 25 September, he joined Girona in the Spanish Segunda División on a season-long loan.

Couto spent the 2021–22 season on loan at Portuguese side S.C. Braga. On 25 July 2022, he returned to Girona on a one-year loan deal, with the club now in La Liga.

International career
Couto was an undisputed starter for the Brazil under-17 football team, playing 20 matches and scoring once before being included in the 23-man list for the 2019 FIFA U-17 World Cup.

Career statistics

References

External links

2002 births
Living people
Brazilian footballers
Brazil youth international footballers
Association football defenders
Coritiba Foot Ball Club players
Manchester City F.C. players
Segunda División players
Girona FC players
Primeira Liga players
S.C. Braga players
Brazilian expatriate footballers
Expatriate footballers in Spain
Brazilian expatriate sportspeople in Spain
Expatriate footballers in Portugal
Footballers from Curitiba